Hajji Nasrat Khan is an elderly citizen of Afghanistan best known for the more than three years he spent in the United States Guantanamo Bay detention camps, in Cuba. The United States Department of Defense believed that he was an enemy combatant and assigned him the Internment Serial Number 1009.

Khan has been crippled since 1986.
In April 2006, Khan was 80 years old.
He was the oldest prisoner remaining at Guantanamo by the time he was released (August, 2006 ).

Combatant Status Review Tribunal

Nasrat Khan was among the 60% of prisoners who chose to participate in his tribunal hearings.

Summary of Evidence memo

A Summary of Evidence memo was prepared for Hajji Nasrat Khan's Combatant Status Review Tribunal, on 5 October 2004.
The memo listed the following allegations against him:

Transcript

Khan chose to participate in his Combatant Status Review Tribunal.

Administrative Review Board hearing

Detainees who were determined to have been properly classified as "enemy combatants" were scheduled to have their dossier reviewed at annual Administrative Review Board hearings.  The Administrative Review Boards weren't authorized to review whether a detainee qualified for POW status, and they weren't authorized to review whether a detainee should have been classified as an "enemy combatant".

They were authorized to consider whether a detainee should continue to be detained by the United States, because they continued to pose a threat - or whether they could safely be repatriated to the custody of their home country, or whether they could be set free.

Khan chose to participate in his Administrative Review Board hearing.

The following primary factors favor continued detention

The following primary factor favor release or transfer

Witness at other Tribunals

Khan was interviewed, and provided a statement for Hamidullah's Tribunal.
He confirmed that Hamidullah had only been a teenager when he had been in the HiG, and that he had been a deserter.

Habeas Corpus
Philadelphia lawyer Peter M. Ryan
is representing Khan in his habeas corpus motion.

Khan's age

United Kingdom newspaper, The Guardian, republished an Associated Press article, devoted to Khan, which speculated about his age.

The article says that the United States estimates Khan's age as 71.  It says that Khan doesn't know his age for sure, but believes he is about 78.  The article states that Khan requires a walker.

Return to Afghanistan

Khan was reported to have been one of five Afghans returned to Afghanistan on August 28, 2006.

Peter M. Ryan, one of Khan's lawyers, learned of his return by e-mail from the DoD, on the following weekend,   and never did learn the reason for Khan's detention.

Ryan initially expressed concerns whether Khan could expect the Afghan authorities to free him, upon his return, or whether they would put him in the Afghan prison system., but Khan did not ultimately face arrest upon his return to Afghanistan.

Guantanamo Medical records

On 16 March 2007, the Department of Defense published medical records for the detainees.

See also
 Hiztullah Yar Nasrat his son formerly detained at Guantanamo
 Mohammed Sadiq another elderly prisoner held at Guantanamo
 Haji Faiz Mohammed elderly prisoner held at Guantanamo

References

External links 
America's prison for terrorists often held the wrong men McClatchy June 15, 2008
Nusrat Khan McClatchy
Guantánamo: The Stories of Three Innocent Jordanians and an Afghan, Just Released Andy Worthington

Guantanamo detainees known to have been released
Possibly living people
1920s births
Afghan extrajudicial prisoners of the United States
Pashtun people